Michael Cheetham is an English retired footballer most notable for his time at Cambridge United in the early 1990s.

Career
Ipswich Town manager Bobby Robson paid to buy him out of the army to enable him to start his football career at Portman Road where he went on to make 4 appearances.

After a loan spell at Cambridge United in 1989, he signed permanently at The Abbey Stadium for a fee of £50,000 in 1990 and went on to be a permanent fixture in the side that gained successive promotions to the old Division Two under controversial manager John Beck. Winger Cheetham played a total of 132 games for the club, scoring 22 goals before joining Chesterfield on a free transfer in 1994.

After just 5 appearances at Saltergate, Cheetham moved back to East Anglia with Colchester United where he ended his league career by playing a further 37 games, scoring 3 goals.

After dropping out of professional football he had spells at Cambridge City, Sudbury Town and AFC Sudbury where he had a spell as coach.

Honours

Club
Cambridge United
 Football League Third Division Winner (1): 1990–91
 Football League Fourth Division Playoff Winner (1): 1989–90

References

External links

Profile AFC Sudbury

English footballers
Basingstoke Town F.C. players
Ipswich Town F.C. players
Cambridge United F.C. players
Chesterfield F.C. players
Colchester United F.C. players
Sudbury Town F.C. players
Cambridge City F.C. players
A.F.C. Sudbury players
A.F.C. Sudbury non-playing staff
Living people
1967 births
English Football League players
Association football midfielders